Brian Irvine may refer to:

Brian Irvine (composer) (born 1965), Northern Irish composer
Brian Irvine (cricketer), South African test cricketer
Brian Irvine (footballer) (born 1965), Scottish international football player